Jaque Mate is a 2011 Dominican thriller drama film directed and written by José María Cabral. The film was selected as the Dominican entry for the Best Foreign Language Oscar at the 85th Academy Awards.

Cast
 Adrián Mas as David Hernandez
 Frank Perozo as Andres G. / Kidnapper
 Marcos Bonetti as Daniel
 Michelle Vargas as Alejandra H.
 Sharlene Taulé as Maggie
 Alfonso Rodríguez as Inspector Peralta
 Evelina Rodriguez as Agente Diaz
 Olga Bucarelli as Manuela
 Sergio Carlo as Fernando
 Luis Nova as Stage Manager
 David Ortiz as himself
 Johnie Mercedes as Police #1
 Luis Manuel Aguilo as Francisco Rosa

Plot
David Hernandez is the well-known host of a popular fictional game show, “Jaque Mate” (Checkmate). The show has a segment in which he answers calls from audience members. One day he receives an anonymous call, telling him his son and his wife have been kidnapped. The kidnapper threatens him with killing them if he doesn't follow his instructions, making David play his game on live television. This results in David's pursuit to get his family back safe and sound.

Production

Development
The director was inspired to write the script after watching the documentary “Fuga o Muerte” (Run or Die) about the robbery of Dominican Republic's Banco del Progreso in 1993.

Dominican production house, Antena Latina Films, produced the film. The film premiered on 12 April 2011. The premier was widely publicized through social media by the production company. They encouraged the public to attend the premier by raffling tickets through various media outlets.

Awards

See also
 List of submissions to the 85th Academy Awards for Best Foreign Language Film
 List of Dominican submissions for the Academy Award for Best Foreign Language Film

References

External links
 

2011 films
2011 thriller drama films
Dominican Republic thriller drama films
2010s Spanish-language films
Dominican Republic LGBT-related films
LGBT-related thriller drama films
Films about kidnapping
Films about television people